

Events 
 January–June 
 February – The Sinhalese abandon the siege of Colombo, capital of Portuguese Ceylon.
 February 9 – The sudden death of Álvaro de Bazán, 1st Marquis of Santa Cruz, in the midst of preparations for the Spanish Armada, forces King Philip II of Spain to re-allocate the command of the fleet.
 April 14 (April 4 Old Style) – Christian IV becomes king of Denmark–Norway, upon the death of his father, Frederick II.
 May 12 – Day of the Barricades in Paris: Henry I, Duke of Guise seizes the city, forcing King Henry III to flee.
 May 28 – The Spanish Armada, with 130 ships and 30,000 men, begins to set sail from the Tagus estuary, under the command of the Duke of Medina Sedonia and Juan Martínez de Recalde, heading for the English Channel (it will take until May 30 for all of the ships to leave port).

 July–December 
 July – King Henry III of France capitulates to the Duke of Guise, and returns to Paris.
 July 31 – The first engagement between the English and Spanish fleets (off of Plymouth) results in a victory for the English, under command of Lord Howard of Effingham and Sir Francis Drake.
 August 2 – The English fleet defeats the Spanish fleet, off the Isle of Portland.
 August 6 (July 29 Old Style) – Battle of Gravelines: The Spanish Armada is defeated by the English naval force off the coast of Gravelines, in the Spanish Netherlands (modern France).
 August 7 – The English fleet defeats the Spanish fleet off the coast of Flanders.
 August 8–9 – The Spanish are unable to reach the coast of Flanders, to meet up with the army of the Duke of Parma. The Duke of Medina Sidonia decides to return to Spain.
 August 12 – The fleeing Spanish fleet sails past the Firth of Forth, and the English call off their pursuit. Much of the Spanish fleet is destroyed by storms, as it sails for home around Scotland and Ireland.
 October 7 – The first biography of Nicolaus Copernicus (d.1543) is completed by Bernardino Baldi.
 December 5 – The Order of Augustinian Recollects is formally recognised as a separate province from the Order of Saint Augustine, an event later known as the Día de la Recolección or Day of Recollection.
 December 23 – Henry III of France strikes his ultra-Catholic enemies, having the Duke of Guise and his brother, Louis II, Cardinal of Guise, killed, and holding the Cardinal de Bourbon a prisoner. As a result, large parts of France reject Henry III as their king, forcing him to side with Henry of Navarre.

 Unknown 
 William Morgan's Welsh translation of the Bible is published.
 The Armada Portrait of Elizabeth I of England is created, to celebrate the English defeat of the Spanish Armada, and to assert the strength of Elizabeth herself.
 Sword hunt in Japan.

Births

January–June

 January 4 – Arnold Vinnius, Dutch lawyer (d. 1657)
 January 6 – Elizabeth Stanley, Countess of Huntingdon, English noblewoman and writer (d. 1633)
 January 20 – Francesco Gessi, Italian painter (d. 1649)
 February 2 – Georg II of Fleckenstein-Dagstuhl, German nobleman (d. 1644)
 February 15 – Benjamin Bramer, German mathematician (d. 1652)
 March 12 – Herman de Neyt, Flemish painter (d. 1642)
 March 21 – Egon VIII of Fürstenberg-Heiligenberg, Bavarian count and field-marshal (d. 1635)
 March 22 – Frederick IX, Margrave of Brandenburg, Grand Master of the Order of Saint John (d. 1611)
 March 27 – Celestyn Myślenta, Polish theologian (d. 1653)
 March 29 – Margherita Aldobrandini, Parmesan regent (d. 1646)
 March – Johann Heinrich Alsted, German theologian (d. 1638)
 April 4 – Padovanino, Italian painter (d. 1649)
 April 5 – Thomas Hobbes, English philosopher (d. 1679)
 April 15 – Claudius Salmasius, French classical scholar (d. 1653)
 April 16 – Emanuel Filibert of Savoy, Viceroy of Sicily (d. 1624)
 May 2 – Étienne Pascal, French mathematician (d. 1651)
 May 9 – Herman Hugo, Jesuit priest, writer, military chaplain (d. 1629)
 May 13 – Ole Worm, Danish physician and antiquary (d. 1654)
 May 28 – Pierre Séguier, Chancellor of France (d. 1672)
 June 3 – Julius Frederick, Duke of Württemberg-Weiltingen (1617–16135) (d. 1635)
 June 9 – Johann Andreas Herbst, German composer and music theorist (d. 1666)
 June 11 – George Wither, English poet and satirist (d. 1667)
 June 14 – Hoshina Masasada, Japanese daimyō who ruled the Ino Domain (d. 1661)
 June 30 – Giovanni Maria Sabino, Italian composer, organist and teacher (d. 1649)

July–December

 July 7 – Wolrad IV, Count of Waldeck-Eisenberg (1588–1640) (d. 1640)
 July 29 – William Spring of Pakenham, Member of Parliament (d. 1638)
 August 25 – Elizabeth Poole, English settler in Plymouth Colony (d. 1654)
 August – François de La Mothe Le Vayer, French writer (d. 1672)
 September 1 – Henri, Prince of Condé (d. 1646)
 September 8 – Marin Mersenne, French theologian (d. 1648)
 September 10 – Nicholas Lanier, English composer (d. 1666)
 September 13 – Edward Vaux, 4th Baron Vaux of Harrowden, English baron (d. 1661)
 October 7 – Sir Drue Drury, 1st Baronet, English politician (d. 1632)
 October 16 – Luke Wadding, Irish Franciscan friar and historian (d. 1657)
 October 17 – Matthias Gallas, Austrian soldier (d. 1647)
 November 25 – Gilbert Ironside the elder, English bishop (d. 1671)
 December 10
 Johann von Aldringen, Austrian field marshal (d. 1634)
 Isaac Beeckman, Dutch philosopher and scientist (d. 1637)
 December 15
 Charles de Condren, French theologian (d. 1641)
 Adolf Frederick I, Duke of Mecklenburg-Schwerin (1592–1628 and again 1631–1658) (d. 1658)
 December 23 – Claude Bernard, French priest (d. 1641)
 December 24 – Constance of Austria, Queen of Poland (d. 1631)

Date unknown
 John Danvers, English politician (d. 1655)
 John Endecott, English politician (d. 1665)
 Robert Filmer, English political writer (d. 1653)
 Accepted Frewen, English churchman (d. 1664)
 Madame Ke, influential nanny of the Tianqi Emperor of China (approximately; d. 1627)
 Francis Higginson, colonial American Puritan (d. 1630)
 Jan Janssonius, Dutch cartographer (d. 1664)
 Catherine de Vivonne, marquise de Rambouillet (d. 1665)
 John Winthrop, influential Puritan in the history of Massachusetts (d. 1649)

Deaths 

 January 17 – Qi Jiguang, Chinese general (b. 1528)
 February 9 – Álvaro de Bazán, 1st Marquis of Santa Cruz, Spanish admiral (b. 1526)
 February 24 – Johann Weyer, Dutch physician and occultist (b. 1515)
 March 3 – Henry XI of Legnica, Duke of Legnica (b. 1539)
 March 5 – Henri, Prince of Condé (b. 1552)
 March 10 – Theodor Zwinger, Swiss scholar (b. 1533)
 April 4 – King Frederick II of Denmark (b. 1534)
 April 19 – Paolo Veronese, Italian painter (b. c. 1528)
 May 5 – Giorgio Biandrata, Italian physician (b. 1515)
 May 12 – Peter Monau, German physician (b. 1551)
 June 5 – Anne Cecil, Countess of Oxford, English countess (b. 1556)
 June 7 – Philip II, Margrave of Baden-Baden (b. 1559)
 June 10 – Valentin Weigel, German theologian (b. 1533).
 June 13 – Countess Anna of Nassau (b. 1563)
 June 18 – Robert Crowley, London stationer (b. 1517)
 July 17 – Mimar Sinan, Ottoman architect (b. 1489)
 August 6 – Josias I, Count of Waldeck-Eisenberg, Count of Waldeck-Eisenberg (1578-1588) (b. 1554)
 August 8 – Alonso Sánchez Coello, Spanish painter (b. c. 1531)
 August 12 – Alfonso Ferrabosco the elder,  Italian composer (b. 1543)
 August 30 – Margaret Ward,  English saint (birthdate unknown)
 August 31 – Juliana of Nassau-Dillenburg, Dutch prince (b. 1546)
 September 3 – Richard Tarlton, English actor (b. 1530)
 September 4 – Robert Dudley, 1st Earl of Leicester, English politician (b. 1532)
 September 25 – Tilemann Heshusius, German Gnesio-Lutheran theologian (b. 1527)
 September 26 – Amias Paulet, Governor of Jersey (b. 1532)
 October 1 – Edward James, English Catholic martyr (executed at Chichester)
 October 2 – Bernardino Telesio, Italian philosopher and natural scientist (b. 1509)
 October 23 – Juan Martínez de Recalde, Spanish admiral (b. c. 1540)
 November 1 – Jean Daurat, French poet and scholar (b. 1508)
 December 19 – Esther Handali, Ottoman businessperson
 December 23 – Henry I, Duke of Guise, French Catholic leader (b. 1550)
 December 24 – Louis II, Cardinal of Guise, French Catholic cardinal (b. 1555)
 date unknown
Diego Durán, Dominican friar and historian in colonial Mexico (b. c. 1537).
 John Field, British Puritan clergyman and controversialist (b. 1545)
 Sonam Gyatso, 3rd Dalai Lama, the first Dalai Lama to use the title (b. 1543)
 Plautilla Nelli, Italian painter (b. 1524)
 Edwin Sandys, English prelate (b. 1519)
 Kenau Simonsdochter Hasselaer, Dutch war heroine (b. 1526)

References 

 
Leap years in the Gregorian calendar